Conus hendersoni is a fossil species of sea snail, a marine gastropod mollusk in the family Conidae, the cone snails, cone shells or cones.

Description

Distribution
This marine species is only found in the fossil state in New Zealand. The species became extinct in the latest Miocene in response to the terminal Miocene glaciation of West Antarctica

References

 Maxwell, P.A. (2009). Cenozoic Mollusca. pp 232–254 in Gordon, D.P. (ed.) New Zealand inventory of biodiversity. Volume one. Kingdom Animalia: Radiata, Lophotrochozoa, Deuterostomia. Canterbury University Press, Christchurch.

External links
 To World Register of Marine Species

hendersoni
Gastropods described in 1931
Extinct gastropods
Extinct animals of New Zealand